U1 small nuclear ribonucleoprotein A is a protein that in humans is encoded by the SNRPA gene.

Interactions 

Small nuclear ribonucleoprotein polypeptide A has been shown to interact with CDC5L.

References

Further reading